Sergei Vasilievich Lebedev (13 July 1874 – 2 May 1934) was a Russian/Soviet chemist and the inventor of polybutadiene synthetic rubber, the first commercially viable and mass-produced type of synthetic rubber.

Biography 
Lebedev was born in 1874 in  Lublin and went to school in Warsaw. In 1900, he graduated from St. Petersburg University and found work at the Petersburg Margarine Factory.

Starting in 1902, Lebedev moved from university to university in Russia, starting at the Saint-Petersburg Institute for Railroad Engineering. In 1904, he returned to St. Petersburg University to work under Alexey Favorsky (Stalin Prize,  1941,   for contributions to the manufacture of synthetic rubber). 

In 1905, he married his second wife, the artist Anna Ostroumova-Lebedeva.

In 1915, Lebedev  was appointed Professor at the Women's Pedagogical Institute in St. Petersburg. After 1916, he was a Professor of the Saint Petersburg Academy for Military Medicine. In 1925, he became the leader of the Oil Laboratory (after 1928, the Laboratory of Synthetic Resins) at St. Petersburg University.

He died in Leningrad and is interred in Tikhvin Cemetery.

Works 
Lebedev's main works are devoted to polymerisation of diene hydrocarbons. He was the first to research the polymerisation of butadiene (1910–1913). In 1910, Lebedev was the first to get synthetic rubber based on poly-butadiene. His book Research in polymerisation of by-ethylene hydrocarbons (1913) became the bible for studies of synthetic rubber.

After 1914, he studied polymerisation of ethylene monomers, leading to modern industrial methods for manufacturing of butyl synthetic rubber and poly-isobutylene. Between 1926 and 1928, he developed a single-stage method for manufacturing butadiene out of ethanol. In 1928, he developed an industrial method for producing synthetic rubber based on polymerisation of butadiene using metallic sodium as a catalyst. This method became the base for the Soviet industry of synthetic rubber. The Soviets lacked reliable access to natural rubber, making the manufacture of synthetic rubber important. The first three synthetic rubber plants were launched in 1932–33. For butadiene production they used grain or potato ethanol as a feedstock. It caused a number of jokes about "Russian method of making tires from potatoes".

By 1940, the Soviet Union had the largest synthetic rubber industry in the world, producing more than 50,000 tons per year. During World War II, Lebedev's process of obtaining butadiene from ethyl alcohol was also used by the German rubber industry.

Another important contribution of Lebedev's was the study of the kinetics of hydrogenation of ethylene hydrocarbons and the development of a number of synthetic motor oils for aircraft engines.

Honors 
 In 1931, Lebedev was awarded the Order of Lenin for his work on synthetic rubber
 In 1932, he became a full member of the Soviet Academy of Sciences.
 In 1945 the National Institute for Synthetic Rubber was named "Lebedev's Institute".

References

External links
 
 July 25 – Today In Science History at www.todayinsci.com
 Butadiene: Definition and Much More from Answers.com at www.answers.com

1874 births
1934 deaths
Scientists from Lublin
Soviet chemists
Polymer scientists and engineers
Saint Petersburg State University alumni
Full Members of the USSR Academy of Sciences
Academic staff of Saint Petersburg State University
Burials at Tikhvin Cemetery
Soviet inventors
Chemists from the Russian Empire